Adriano Politi (1542 – 15 January 1625) was an Italian translator, philologist and classical scholar. He belonged to the Sienese School of philologists.

Biography 
Adriano Politi was born at San Quirico d'Orcia in 1542. He chose the ecclesiastical career, and was attached as secretary to the cardinals Capizucchi, Serbelloni, Cornaro and Aldobrandini. He died in Sarteano in January 1625.

Works 
Adriano Politi is best known today for his Italian translation of Tacitus (Opere di C. Tacito, Rome, 1604 and 1611; a revised and improved edition of Politi's translation was published in Venice in 1644). Politi's translation was reissued in the luxurious edition of Tacitus's complete works, edited by Girolamo Canini d'Anghiari. Published in 1618 by Giunti and Ciotti, this new edition of Politi's translation was hugely successful despite being a complex and expensive work. When he reprinted it just two years later the printer Giunti noted that in only a few months it had sold 1,200 copies but demand outstripped the supply. The edition was reissued three times during the first half of the century (1620, 1628, and 1641). Politi published also a Dittionario Toscano (Rome, 1614, 8vo): this work, an abridgment of the Vocabolario degli Accademici della Crusca, added Sienese equivalents to some of the Vocabolario distinctively Florentine lexical items. Among his other notable works is the Ordo Romanæ historiæ legendæ (Venice, 1627, 4to, and in vol. 3 of Gaudenzio Roberti's Miscellanea Italica erudita).

Notes

Bibliography 

 
 
  This entry cites:
 Ferdinand Hoefer, Nouvelle Biographie Générale, 40, 616.
 

1542 births
1625 deaths
17th-century Italian translators
Italian philologists
Italian classical scholars
Italian male non-fiction writers